ModCloth is an American online retailer of indie and vintage-inspired women’s clothing. The company is headquartered in Los Angeles.

History 
Modcloth was founded in 2002 by Susan Gregg Koger and Eric Koger. Susan and Eric were students at Carnegie Mellon University and launched ModCloth as a website to sell used vintage dresses. ModCloth grossed $18,000 in revenue in 2005 and received its first round of seed funding in 2008. In 2009, ModCloth reported $15 million in revenue, allowing it to relocate its headquarters from Pittsburgh's Strip District to San Francisco. ModCloth reported $100 million in revenue in 2012 and $150 million in 2014.

In January 2015, ModCloth announced the appointment of Matthew A. Kaness as CEO replacing Eric Koger. Kaness had previously held the role of CSO at Urban Outfitters, Inc. Under Kaness’s leadership, ModCloth launched its first namesake label as part of monthly collections in August 2015. The company quickly became a multichannel retailer when it opened its first pop-up Fit Shop in Los Angeles, followed by another in San Francisco. ModCloth pop-up shops carried a curated collection of ModCloth clothing, accessories, and home decor, along with select pieces from local artists. ModCloth used these pop-up stores to promote existing online and social media services such as Fit for Me and the Style Gallery.

ModCloth opened pop-up stores in other cities as part of the 2016 “ModCloth IRL Tour”, including Washington D.C., Portland, Austin, Denver and Pittsburgh. Following these temporary store experiments, ModCloth opened its first permanent FitShop in Austin in November 2016. All IRL shops have since closed.

In March 2017, ModCloth was acquired by Jet.com, a subsidiary of Walmart. Jet.com noted ModCloth would run independently, similar to the arrangement in place for other companies they had acquired in the past. Both the website and the retail store in Austin would be retained by ModCloth. The partnership would give ModCloth more working capital, the ability to open more physical stores  and grow the business to reach more consumers. Though the financial terms of the acquisition were not disclosed, the deal was estimated to be between $51 million to $75 million.

In October 2019, Walmart sold ModCloth to brand investment platform Go Global Retail, in a year when Walmart was facing projected losses of $1 billion in its e-commerce division.

In May 2021, Nogin acquired Modcloth from Go Global Retail for an undisclosed sum.

Stance on body image

Truth in Advertising Act endorsement
In 2014, ModCloth became the first retailer to sign the Heroes Pledge for Advertisers. As an endorser, ModCloth committed to not use Photoshop to “change the shape, size, proportion, color, and/or remove/enhance the physical features” of its advertising models in post-production. In June 2016, ModCloth hosted an event on Capitol Hill to support the 2016 Truth in Advertising Act. Modcloth’s Susan Gregg Koger spoke at this event along with Representative Ileana Ros-Lehtinen, who was one of the introducers of the act.

Real people as models
In 2015, ModCloth began using staff members as models for its swimwear advertising campaigns. ModCloth’s swimsuit campaign launched in response to research that correlated low self-esteem for women with exposed to thin models.

Plus-size rebranding
In 2015, ModCloth removed the plus-size term from its site. The company’s decision was supported by a ModCloth survey, which concluded that almost two-thirds of women were embarrassed to shop in a separate section for plus-labeled clothing. The plus-size clothing was integrated into the greater site and made shoppable through size filters.

Crowdsourcing initiatives
ModCloth has developed several crowdsourcing initiatives that have impacted its product line.

Style Gallery
Style Gallery is a user-generated image gallery where customers send photos of themselves modelling in a purchased ModCloth garment. These photos are then featured on the ModCloth blog, allowing visitors to see how a certain clothing item looks when worn by a real customer rather than a professional model.

Fit for Me
Fit for Me is a feature on the ModCloth app, which allows users to see suggestions for clothing that will fit their exact body shape based on other users’ reviews. Users input their own body measurements when they leave a review for a previously purchased product. Fit for Me uses this data to generate specific clothing recommendations depending on the user’s measurements.

Be The Buyer
In 2009, ModCloth ran the Be the Buyer program, which allowed users to decide which clothing designs would be produced and sold by ModCloth. Users voted on clothing samples via an online tradeshow. If a certain product received a large enough quantity of votes, it would be pushed to production and available for purchase on ModCloth’s website. Using this model, ModCloth became the first retailer to supplement an existing business model with crowdsourcing efforts.

Make the Cut
ModCloth ran the Make the Cut contest in 2012, where ModCloth created products based on consumer ideas. Customers were invited to submit clothing sketches, which were voted on by other users. The contest winners had their sketches adapted into real clothing for the spring line, with each Make the Cut garment product featuring the artist’s name printed on the label.

Deva Pardue design 
ModCloth received negative press for using a design by artist Deva Pardue without permission or credit.

Philanthropy
On March 5, 2012, ModCloth announced a donation of dresses to The Princess Project. The project has been created to provide free prom dresses and accessories to high school girls who cannot otherwise afford them. For every dress purchased from its Fancy Frocks collection that day, ModCloth said it would donate a dress to the nonprofit.

In 2015, ModCloth began a partnership with Schoola to raise money for Malala Yousafzai’s Malala Fund, which advocates and supports education for young women. ModCloth participated in the cause by donating clothing, which Schoola sells for a discount. The proceeds are then donated to the Malala Fund.

References 

Walmart
Online clothing retailers of the United States
American companies established in 2002
Clothing companies established in 2002
Retail companies established in 2002
Internet properties established in 2002
2017 mergers and acquisitions
Companies based in San Francisco
2002 establishments in Pennsylvania